Barbara-Maria "Barbi" Henneberger (4 October 1940 – 12 April 1964) was an alpine ski racer and Olympic medalist from West Germany. She competed for the United Team of Germany at the 1960 and 1964 Winter Olympics, and at the 1962 World Championships.

Ski racing
Born in Oberstaufen, Bavaria, Henneberger competed in the 1960 Winter Olympics at Squaw Valley at age 19. She won the bronze medal in the slalom, finished eleventh in the downhill, and 15th in the giant slalom. Henneberger was third in the combined, which earned a world championship medal. Four years later in 1964 at Innsbruck, she finished fifth in the downhill, seventh in the giant slalom, and tenth in the slalom.

In North America to model clothes after the 1963 season ended in Europe, Henneberger was not planning to compete at the U.S. Alpine Championships in Alaska at Alyeska in early April. Using borrowed skis, she won the downhill and slalom and finished second in the giant slalom.

Death
Following the 1964 season, Henneberger and a dozen others were in Switzerland near St. Moritz in April to film the promotional movie Ski-Fascination for Willy Bogner, Jr. Caught in a spring avalanche, she died at age 23 in Val Selin along with U.S. racer Buddy Werner. Both had raced ahead of the first avalanche, but were caught by a second from an opposite slope. Found hours later under  of snow, their deaths were attributed to suffocation, and were the only two fatalities in the group. Her funeral and procession in Munich were attended by thousands.

Bogner, 22, and Henneberger were to be engaged that summer; he was tried by a Swiss court for homicide by negligence. After Bogner was initially acquitted, the prosecution pursued an appeal and won a conviction for manslaughter by negligence, and Bogner received a two-month suspended sentence.

World championship results 

From 1948 through 1980, the Winter Olympics were also the World Championships for alpine skiing.

Olympic results

References

External links

 
 
 
 Barbi Henneberger photos  at Alpine Style 56
 

1940 births
1964 deaths
German female alpine skiers
Olympic alpine skiers of the United Team of Germany
Olympic bronze medalists for the United Team of Germany
Olympic medalists in alpine skiing
Medalists at the 1960 Winter Olympics
Alpine skiers at the 1960 Winter Olympics
Alpine skiers at the 1964 Winter Olympics
Skiing deaths
Sport deaths in Switzerland
Deaths in avalanches
Natural disaster deaths in Switzerland
Universiade medalists in alpine skiing
Universiade gold medalists for West Germany
Competitors at the 1962 Winter Universiade
Sportspeople from Swabia (Bavaria)
People from Oberallgäu